Troides riedeli, or Riedel's birdwing, is a birdwing butterfly endemic to the Tanimbar Islands, part of the Maluku Islands archipelago in Indonesia.

Very little is known of the life history and distribution.

Biogeographic realm

Australasian realm

Related species
Troides riedeli is a member of the Troides haliphron species group. The members of this clade are:

Troides haliphron (Boisduval, 1836)
Troides darsius (Gray, [1853])
Troides vandepolli (Snellen, 1890)
Troides criton (C. & R. Felder, 1860)
Troides riedeli (Kirsch, 1885)
Troides plato (Wallace, 1865)
Troides staudingeri (Röber, 1888)

References

Kurt Rumbucher and Oliver Schäffler (2004). Part 19, Papilionidae X. Troides III. in Erich Bauer and Thomas Frankenbach Eds. Butterflies of the World. Keltern: Goecke & Evers 
Tsukada, E. and Nishiyama, Y. (1982). Butterflies of the South East Asian Islands. Vol. I Papilionidae. (transl. K. Morishita). Plapac Co. Ltd., Tokyo. 457 pp.

External links

Troides riedeli at Nagypal
Butterflycorner Images from Naturhistorisches Museum Wien (English/German)
Banda Sea Islands Moist Deciduous Forests

riedeli
Butterflies of Indonesia
Endemic fauna of Indonesia
Fauna of the Tanimbar Islands
Butterflies described in 1885